Longchamp Abbey, known also as the Convent of the Humility of the Blessed Virgin, was a convent of Poor Clares founded in 1255 in Auteuil, Paris, by Saint Isabelle of France. The site is now occupied by Longchamp Racecourse.

Royal Foundation

Isabelle was the daughter of Louis VIII of France and Blanche of Castile, and the younger sister of King Louis IX of France (Saint Louis). Though betrothed to Hugh, eldest son and heir of Hugh X of Lusignan, Isabelle refused to celebrate the formal wedding due to her fixed determination to remain a virgin, although she never became a nun.

In furtherance of  Isabelle's wish to found a nunnery of Poor Clares, her brother King Louis IX of France began in 1255 to acquire the necessary land in the Forest of Rouvray, not far from the Seine, west of Paris. On 10 June 1256, the first stone of the monastic church was laid. The building appears to have been completed about the beginning of 1259. The less rigorous Rule of Mansuetus allowed the community to hold property. The abbey was named the "Convent of the Humility of the Blessed Virgin". Subject to the Order of Friars Minor, some of the first nuns came from the Poor Clares in Reims. Isabelle never joined the community herself, but did live in the abbey, in a room separate from the nuns’ cells. The King visited often and remembered the Abbey in his will. Isabelle died at Longchamp on 23 February 1270, and was buried in the abbey church.

Abbesses of Longchamp
 Agnès I d'Anneri 1259-1262
 Mathilde de Guyencourt 1262-1263
 Agnès II d’Harcourt 1264-1275 
 Julienne de Toyes 1275-1279
 Agnès II d’Harcourt 1279-1287 
 Jeanne I de Nevers 1288-1294
 Jeanne II de Grèce 1294-1303
 Jeanne III de Vitry 1303-1312
 Jeanne IV d’Harcourt 1312-13??
 Jeanne V de Gueux 13??-1328
 Marie I de Lions 1328-1347
 Jeanne VI de Boucheville 1347-1349
 Agnès III de Liège 1349-1357
 Marie II de Gueux 1357-1369
 Agnès IV La Chevrel 1369-1375
 Jeanne VII de La Neuville 1375-1390
 Laurence Jacob 1390-13??
 Jeanne VIII de La Godicharde 13??-1402
 Agnès V d'Issy 1402-1418 
 Jeanne IX des Essarts 1418-1437 
 Marie III de La Poterne 1437-1451
 Marguerite I Gentianne 1451-1467
 Jeanne X La Porchère 1467-1484
 Jeanne XI Gerente 1484-1500
 Jacqueline de Mailly 1500-1514
 Jeanne XII de Hacqueville 1514-1532 
 Catherine I Picard 1532-15?? 
 Jeanne XIII de Mailly 15??-1540 
 Georgette Cœur 1540-1550
 Louise de Cerasme 1550-1559
 Marie IV Lottin 1559-15??
 Charlotte de La Chambre 15??-1567
 Anne I de Fontaines 1567-1580
 Jeanne XIV de Mailly 1580-1604
 Françoise Potier 1604-1606
 Bonne d'Amours 1606-1608
 Catherine II Brûlart de Sillery 1608-1629
 Claudine I Isabelle de Mailly 1629-1634
 Isabelle II Mortier 1634-16??
 Madeleine Placain 16??-1653
 Catherine III de Bellièvre 1658-1668
 Claudine II de Bellièvre 1668-1670
 Claudine I Isabelle de Mailly 1670-1673
 Catherine III Marie Dorat 1673-1676 
 Catherine-Elisabeth I de Gournay 1676-1679
 Marguerite II Isabelle de Flecelles, 1679-1683
 Catherine III Marie Dorat 1683-1685 
 Marie-Anne I Dorat 1685-1688 
 Anne-Marie de Bragelongne 1688-1691
 Catherine III Marie Dorat 1691-1694 
 Marie-Anne I Dorat 1694-1697 
 Catherine III Marie Dorat 1697-1700 
 Marie-Anne I Dorat 1700-1700
 Elisabeth-Henriette Guignard 1700-1703 
 Catherine III Marie Dorat 1703-1706 
 Marguerite III Agnès Nolet 1706-1709 
 Elisabeth-Henriette Guignard 1709-1712 
 Marguerite III Agnès Nolet 1712-1715 
 Catherine-Elisabeth II Le Cosquino 1715-1718 
 Marguerite III Agnès Nolet 1718-17?? 
 Catherine-Elisabeth II Le Cosquino 17??-1721 
 Marie-Anne II Le Jau 1721-1724 
 Catherine-Elisabeth II Le Cosquino 1724-1730 
 Marie-Anne II Le Jau 1730-1733 
 Catherine-Elisabeth II Le Cosquino 1733-1737 
 Catherine IV Thérèse de Tourmont 1737-1740
 Anne II Louise de Tourmont 1740-17??
 Marie V Jeanne Jouy 17??-1790

Destruction

Longchamp Abbey underwent many vicissitudes. During the French Revolution, on 26 February 1790, the nuns were served with an order of  expulsion; on 17 September 1792 the valuables and sacred objects were taken away from the chapel and by 12 October that year the nuns had left the abbey. In 1794 the empty building was offered for sale, but, as no one wished to purchase it, it was destroyed. In 1857 the remaining walls were pulled down, except for one tower, and the grounds were added to the Bois de Boulogne.

Depictions 
 Misbach, Vue de l'abbaye de Longchamp prise du pied du jardin de M. Lagarde, Bibliothèque nationale de France, Paris.

See also
 Prix de l'Abbaye de Longchamp (a flat horse race, open to thoroughbreds aged two years or older, run at Longchamp Racecourse each year in early October).

References

Further reading
Gaston Duchesne, Histoire de l'abbaye royale de Longchamp, 1257–1789, Paris, 1904.
 Gerturd Młynarczyk, Ein Franziskanerinnenkloster im XV. Jahrhundert,  : Edition und Analyse von Besitzinventaren aus der Abtei Longchamp, Bonn, L. Röhrscheid, 1987.
Sean L. Field, Isabelle of France:  Capetian Sanctity and Franciscan Identity in the Thirteenth Century (University of Notre Dame Press, 2006, . 
Sean L. Field, ed. and trans., The Writings of Agnes of Harcourt:  The Life of Isabelle of France and the Letter on Louis IX and Longchamp (University of Notre Dame Press, 2003).

Poor Clare monasteries in France
1255 establishments in Europe
1250s establishments in France